James Naughton (1865 – 1950) was an Irish prelate who served as Bishop of Killala.

He was born in Ballina, County Mayo. Naughton was ordained priest on 24 June 1889. He was appointed Bishop of Killala on 27 November 1911, and received episcopal ordination  on 7 January 1912.

References

Roman Catholic bishops of Killala
20th-century Roman Catholic bishops in Ireland
1865 births
1950 deaths
People from County Mayo